SafeDNS is a company founded in 2010 in Virginia, US. It provides web filtering to block malicious websites on either a Windows device or a network for parental control. The company provides products to commercial and corporate users.

Products

SafeDNS provides products to block access to applications that are not approved by an administrator, as well as parental control software to filter dangerous content.

In 2015 SafeDNS parental control service was reviewed by PC Magazine with an average rating. Additionally, SafeDNS Parental Control was certified by AV-Comparatives, a European test lab for online safety and anti-virus software.

See also
 Google Public DNS
 Norton ConnectSafe
 OpenDNS
 Zscaler

References

Companies based in Alexandria, Virginia
Alternative Internet DNS services
Internet properties established in 2010
Content-control software